Embleton is a small village and civil parish located in the Allerdale district in Cumbria, England. It is located east of Cockermouth on the A66 road, and within the boundaries of the Lake District National Park.

As of the 2001 census the parish had a population of 297, reducing slightly to 294 at the 2011 Census.

Embleton railway station opened in 1865, on the Cockermouth, Keswick and Penrith Railway, and was closed by British Rail in 1958 although the railway through the village survived until 1966.  The trackbed has now been used for the route of the A66 road.

Sometime around 1854 a schoolmaster digging in commonland at Embleton came across a hoard of weapons dating to the 1st century AD, the transition between the Late Iron Age and Early Roman period. It comprised three iron spearheads and two swords, one of which was in a decorated copper-alloy scabbard. The latter object can now be seen in the British Museum

Governance
Embleton is within the Copeland UK Parliamentary constituency,  Trudy Harrison is the Member of parliament.

Before Brexit, its residents were covered by the North West England European Parliamentary Constituency.

It has its own parish council, jointly with the parishes of Dubwath, Setmurthy  and Wythop, known as Embleton and District Parish Council.

See also

Listed buildings in Embleton, Cumbria
Embleton railway station

References

External links
Cumbria County History Trust: Embleton (nb: provisional research only – see Talk page)

Villages in Cumbria
Allerdale
Civil parishes in Cumbria